DWAW (99.9 FM), broadcasting as 99.9 Wow Smile Radio, is a radio station owned by Allied Broadcasting Center and operated by Wow Smile Media Services. Its studios and transmitter are located at Madrileña St., Roseville Subd., Brgy. Bibincahan, Sorsogon City.

History
The station was established in 2014 on Radio Sorsogon Network-owned 107.3 FM. On June 13, 2022, it took over Allied Broadcasting Center's 99.9 FM, which was formerly occupied by Padaba FM.

References

Radio stations in Sorsogon
Radio stations established in 2014